Texas State Highway Loop 237 was a state highway designation used twice in the U.S. state of Texas:
Texas State Highway Loop 237 (pre-1953), former route in Texarkana
Texas State Highway Loop 237 (1958-1990), now Business I-20 in Roscoe

237